Lancashire Rock is the official guidebook to rock climbing in Lancashire. Originally put together in 1969 by Les Ainsworth and supporting volunteers, there have since been seven revisions to the guidebook. The guidebook is now under the control of the British Mountaineering Council, and the latest revision contains some 6,600 climbing routes either in a quarry or on a crag and making it one of the biggest climbing guidebooks in the UK.

External links
Lancashire Rock Website

Climbing books
Sport in Lancashire
Books about England